Championship Pool is a 1993 sports simulation video game released for Nintendo Entertainment System, Super Nintendo Entertainment System, Game Boy, Mega Drive/Genesis, and MS-DOS. The pool (pocket billiards) game was developed by Bitmasters and released by Mindscape. The game was officially endorsed by the Billiard Congress of America.

Gameplay
The game is a straightforward, virtual version of pool, and includes several games: eight-ball, nine-ball, three-ball, ten-ball, fifteen-ball, straight pool (14.1 continuous), rotation, equal offense, and speed pool. The player may play against the computer or up to seven other players using the same console using the "Party Pool" (multiplayer) option. Other gameplay modes include "Tournament" (single-player, computer opponents), "Freestyle" (players make up own game rules), and "Challenge" (single-player, shot practice).

Development 
Championship Pool was designed and programmed by Franz Lanzinger and David O'Riva. The music was done by Jerry Gerber, who also composed music for The New Adventures of Gumby and Gumby: The Movie. The game was released in North America in October 1993 for the NES, and November 1993 for the SNES.

Reception

Electronic Games gave the SNES version 89%. French magazine Joypad gave the SNES game 86%.

References

External links
Gamefaqs.com - Championship Pool

Cue sports video games
Nintendo Entertainment System games
Super Nintendo Entertainment System games
Game Boy games
Sega Genesis games
1993 video games
Multiplayer and single-player video games
Video games developed in the United States
Mindscape games